Bernat Francès Caballero i Mathet was Bishop of Urgell and ex officio Co-Prince of Andorra from 28 July 1817 to 27 September 1824.

References

19th-century Princes of Andorra
Bishops of Urgell
Date of birth unknown
Date of death unknown
19th-century Roman Catholic bishops in Spain